Bej or BEJ may refer to:
 Bey, an Ottoman title
 13258 Bej, a minor planet
 bej, ISO 639-3 code for the Beja language
 Jakarta Stock Exchange

See also 
 BEJ48, a Chinese idol group